Gwangju City Public Stadium is a multi-purpose stadium in Gwangju, Gyeonggi-do, South Korea.  It has currently come to be a popular attraction for Gwangju residents, who attend daily exercise sessions, as well as amateur football games and other activities. The stadium has a capacity of about 4,000 people.

Other stadia in Gwangju, Gyeonggi-do, South Korea
Silchon Public Stadium, Opo Public Stadium and Toichon Public Stadium are also located in Gwangju, Gyeonggi-do, South Korea.

Sports venues in Gyeonggi Province
Football venues in South Korea
Multi-purpose stadiums in South Korea
Buildings and structures in Gwangju, Gyeonggi